Mesocolpia marmorata is a moth in the family Geometridae. It is found in Nigeria and Sierra Leone.

References

External links

Moths described in 1899
Eupitheciini
Moths of Africa
Insects of West Africa